MyStar is an Estonian roll-on/roll-off passenger (ro-pax) ferry operated by Tallink on the Helsinki–Tallinn route. The vessel was built by Rauma Marine Constructions and entered service in December 2022.

, MyStar is the newest ship in Tallink's fleet.

References 

2021 ships
Ships built in Rauma, Finland
Ferries of Estonia